The Melbourne Thistle Football Club was an Australian Anglo-Celtic backed association football (soccer) club based in Melbourne, presumably in the suburb of Albert Park. The club was founded in 1912 and spent most of its existence in the first division league of the Victorian soccer system. The club won seven titles within the state's tier one and tier two leagues, including the Dockerty Cup three times.

Off the field, little is known about the club itself other than a handful of recorded home games were played at the former Middle Park ground in the neighboring suburb of Albert Park. The club was dissolved after resigning from the Victorian First Division mid-season in July 1935.

Honours

League
 First Division
Premiers (4): 1914, 1915, 1920 (Section B), 1925

Cup
 Dockerty Cup
Winners (3): 1914, 1915, 1925
Runners-up (1): 1932

Doubles
First Division and Dockerty Cup: 3
1914, 1915, 1925

References

Soccer clubs in Melbourne
Association football clubs established in 1912
1912 establishments in Australia
Victorian State League teams
Victorian Premier League teams
1935 disestablishments in Australia
Association football clubs disestablished in 1935
Defunct soccer clubs in Australia